The Edson Leader was a weekly newspaper serving the Edson, Alberta area. The Leader was owned by Postmedia Network and ceased publication on January 13, 2020. The Edson and area are still served by The Weekly Anchor Newspaper, which has been publishing for over 30 years.

See also
List of newspapers in Canada

References

External links
Edson Leader

Defunct newspapers published in Alberta
Edson, Alberta
Weekly newspapers published in Alberta
Newspapers established in 1911
Publications disestablished in 2020